The Supercoppa di Lega di Seconda Divisione was an Italian football competition played initially by the three group winners of the Lega Pro Seconda Divisione, formerly Serie C2. It was contested from the 2005–06 season until the 2013–14 season with the abolishment of Lega di Seconda Divisione and foundation of Lega Pro.

Past winners

Seasons from 2005–06 to 2010–11

Seasons from 2011–12 to 2013–14

Matches

2005–06
Venezia – Cavese 1–2
Cavese – Gallipoli 1–1
Gallipoli – Venezia 0–0

2006–07
Legnano – Foligno 1–0
Foligno – Sorrento 0–0
Sorrento – Legnano 1–0

2007–08
Reggiana – Benevento 2–1
Benevento – Pergocrema 2–0
Pergocrema – Reggiana 0–1

2008–09
Varese – Figline 2–2
Cosenza – Varese 1–2
Figline – Cosenza 3–0

2009–10 
Juve Stabia – Südtirol 2–1
Südtirol – Lucchese 0–3
Lucchese – Juve Stabia 4–2

2010–11
Latina – Tritium 0–1
Carpi – Latina 1–0
Tritium – Carpi 0–0

2011–12
Treviso – Perugia 1–2
Perugia – Treviso 0–1

2012–13
Pro Patria – Salernitana 0–3
Salernitana – Pro Patria 2–1

2013–14
Bassano Virtus – Messina 2–0
Messina – Bassano Virtus 1–2

See also
 Lega Pro Seconda Divisione
 Supercoppa di Lega di Prima Divisione
 Football in Italy

External links
 Roll of Honours at Lega-calcio-serie-c.it
 Roll of Honours at TuttaLaC.it

5
Supercup C2
Recurring sporting events established in 2006
Recurring sporting events disestablished in 2014
2006 establishments in Italy
2014 disestablishments in Italy
Defunct football competitions in Italy